The Vivid Color is the debut mini-album released by the Japanese band Vivid. It was released in two different versions: a limited CD+DVD edition and a regular CD only edition. It is the band's first release to be available in two versions. The limited edition came with a DVD of the PV for the mini-album's main promotional track "69-II". The regular edition came with a different track list and two extra tracks, "Kimi Koi" and "Trail of Tears". The mini-album reached number 34 on the Oricon weekly charts, where it charted for two weeks, selling 4,125 copies.

Track listing

2009 albums